East Fork South Fork Crystal River is a tributary of the South Fork Crystal River in Gunnison County, Colorado. The stream's source is on the west side of West Maroon Peak in the Maroon Bells-Snowmass Wilderness.  It flows west to a  confluence with Rock Creek in the White River National Forest that forms the South Fork Crystal River.

See also
List of rivers of Colorado

References

Rivers of Colorado
Rivers of Gunnison County, Colorado
Tributaries of the Colorado River in Colorado